Ambika Singh Yadav is an Indian politician. He was elected to the Bihar Legislative Assembly from Ramgarh in 2009 but was defeated for re-election in 2015. He was during that time a member of the Rashtriya Janata Dal. In 2020, Yadav left Rashtriya Janata Dal and joined the Bahujan Samaj Party.

References

Rashtriya Janata Dal politicians
Bihar MLAs 2010–2015
People from Kaimur district
Living people
Bahujan Samaj Party politicians from Bihar
Year of birth missing (living people)